Mladen Posavec (born 22 August 1971) is a Croatian football manager and former midfielder, who works as an assistant to Al Batin FC manager Alen Horvat.

Playing career
Posavec has had spells at several Austrian clubs.

References

External links
 
 

1971 births
Living people
Sportspeople from Koprivnica
Association football midfielders
Croatian footballers
NK Varaždin players
SW Bregenz players
Croatian Football League players
Austrian Regionalliga players
Croatian expatriate footballers
Expatriate footballers in Austria
Croatian expatriate sportspeople in Austria
Croatian football managers
SC Austria Lustenau managers
Saham SC managers
Croatian expatriate football managers
Expatriate football managers in Austria
Croatian expatriate sportspeople in Saudi Arabia
Croatian expatriate sportspeople in the United Arab Emirates
Expatriate football managers in Oman
Croatian expatriate sportspeople in Oman